Savage Life 2 is the second studio album by American rapper Webbie. The album was released on February 26, 2008, by Trill Entertainment, Asylum Records, and Atlantic Records. The album debuted at number four on the US Billboard 200 with 72,000 copies sold in its first week. The first single was "Independent," featuring Lil Boosie and Lil Phat and peaked at number 9 on the Hot 100. The second single was "I Miss You" featuring LeToya Luckett. The album also features guest appearances by Rick Ross, Bun B and the whole Trill Entertainment roster.

Track listing

Charts

Weekly charts

Year-end charts

References

2008 albums
Webbie albums
Albums produced by Mannie Fresh
Sequel albums